The Soul Return also known as The Return of the Spirit is a novel by an Egyptian writer Tawfiq Al Hakim, as he finished writing it year 1927 while he was a student in France and published it year 1933.

“The Soul Return” was the result of a set of literary and political factors that Al Hakim was influenced by as writers of his generation in Egypt, in a period between the two wars. However, among the most important of them is 1919 revolution, which constituted a victory national idea in the political field as it gave the thinkers hope for achieving the Egyptian character.

The novel was presented in two artworks:

 The Return of the Spirit  (play), starring Saeed Saleh, directed by Galal Al-Sharqawi and produced in the year 1963
 The Return of the Spirit (miniseries), starring Salah Zulfikar, directed by Hussein Kamal and produced in the year 1977

Plot 
Mohsen who left Damanhur where his wealthy family, as he enroll in a Cairo school. Lives a simple life with his three uncles and an aunt who takes care of them after she misses the chance of  her getting married. However, all the males fall in love with their neighbor Suniyah, the modern girl who plays piano, but she disappoints them all. As she falls in love with their neighbor Mustafa. Mustafa a well-off young man, leaves his shop which he inherited from his father Kafr El Zayat. Next, comes to Cairo in search of jobs for ten pounds, as Suniyah encourages him to return to his father’s shop. Suniyah collides with aunt Zanouba who dreams of marrying Mustafa and uses magic to win his heart, but she fails. The 1919 erupts for the return of Saad Zagloul and his comrades who were exiled from their homeland. Mohsen, his uncles and his servants participate in the demonstrations that support the revolution. As the novel begins of them being sick in bed in one room, it ended up in one cell in prison and in one room in a hospital.

Translation into Foreign Languages 
The novel was both translated and published in Russian, specifically in Leningrad year 1935. As well as in French in Paris specifically in Vaskill Publishing year 1937. It was also translated in English in Washington year 1984.

References 

Egyptian novels
1933 novels